The Men's heavyweight boxing competitions at the 2022 Commonwealth Games in Birmingham, England took place between Juley 30 and August 7th at National Exhibition Centre Hall 4. Heavyweights were limited to those boxers weighing between 86 and 92 kilograms.

Like all Commonwealth boxing events, the competition was a straight single-elimination tournament. Both semifinal losers were awarded bronze medals, so no boxers competed again after their first loss. Bouts consisted of three rounds of three minutes each, with one-minute breaks between rounds.

Schedule
The schedule is as follows:

Results
The draw is as follows:

Bracket

References

External link
Results

Boxing at the 2022 Commonwealth Games